Who Killed Nelson Nutmeg? is a 2015 British independent family comedy-mystery film written and directed by Tim Clague and Danny Stack and starring Bonnie Wright.

Premise
Four children on a summer camp holiday suspect the park's mascot, Nelson Nutmeg, has been murdered so they set out to investigate.

Cast
Bonnie Wright as Diane
Loretta Walsh as Billie
Hattie Gotobed as The Colonel
James Grogan as Woody
JJ Brown as Shiv
Jonah Alexander as Swindon
Mark Vernon Freestone as Uncle Derek
Russell Biles as Mr Slug
Jamie Lee-Hill as Nelson Nutmeg

Production
Who Killed Nelson Nutmeg? was filmed on location in Bournemouth and Bridport.  Most of the filming took place at the Freshwater Beach Holiday Park, near Bridport.  According to Danny Stack, filming began on late August 2014 and wrapped up in October 2014.

Release
The film premiered on 10 October 2015 at the 59th BFI London Film Festival.  On 24 June 2016 TriCoast Entertainment released the film on premium VOD and digital platforms.

Reception
Screen Daily was mixed in their opinion, closing their article with the statement "Nelson Nutmeg falls to pieces the moment you try and untangle the twist ending, suggesting that Clague and Stack may have rather underestimated the sophistication of their target audience." MuggleNet was more positive, writing "While a children’s film at its core, Who Killed Nelson Nutmeg? is thoroughly enjoyable for anyone, young or old."

References

External links
 
 

2015 films
2010s adventure comedy films
British adventure films
British independent films
British children's comedy films
British mystery films
British detective films
Films about missing people
Films about murder
2015 comedy films
2010s English-language films
2010s British films